Vladimir V. Okrepilov (born February 23, 1944, Leningrad, Russian) is an economist and  professor.

General Director of the Federal budgetary institution State Regional Centre for Standardization, Metrology and Testing in St. Petersburg and Leningrad Region (State Centre "Test-St.Petersburg").

Work experience 
In 1970 graduated from the Leningrad Mechanical Institute (speciality: "Mechanical equipment of automatic installations").
 From 1965: Leningrad Plant of Radio Engineering Equipment - mechanic, technician, process engineer, senior design-engineer. 
 From 1970 to 1979: public works.
 From 1979: Chief engineer at the D.I. Mendeleyev All–Russian Scientific Research Institute of Metrology (VNIIM)
 From 1986: Director of the Leningrad Center for Standardization and Metrology of the USSR Gosstandart
 From 1990 to 1992: General Director of the Leningrad Centre for Product Testing ("So-yuztest – Leningrad") of the USSR Gosstandart
 From 1992:  General Director of the Russian Centre for Testing and Certification in St.Petersburg ("Rostest-St.Petersburg")
 From 1992 to 2001: General Director of the Centre for Testing and Certification in St.Petersburg (State Centre "Test-St.Petersburg") of Rosstandart.
 From 2001 to 2011: General Director of the Federal State Institution "Centre for Testing and Certification in St.Petersburg" (State Centre "Test-St.Petersburg") of Rosstandart.
 From 2011 till present: General Director of the Federal Budgetary Institution State Regional Centre for Standardization, Metrology and Testing in St. Petersburg and Leningrad Region (State Centre "Test-St.Petersburg") of Rosstandart.

Academic and government awards, prizes, honorary titles, foreign awards 
 Laureate of the RAS Award for the best achievements in science popularization in 2009 (2010)
 Awarded by: Order "For Merits to the Fatherland" of IV grade (1999), "Order of Honor" (2009), "Order of Friendship" (2016),  "Order of Friendship of Peoples" (1988), medals: "Twenty years anniversary of victory in the Great Patriotic War of 1941-1945" (1965), "For valorous work.

Scientific activity 
Scientist-economist, founder of the new field of economic science – Economics of Quality, basing on the use of tools of quality management, standardization and metrology in ensuring socioeconomic progress and the quality of life improvement; the leader of the scientific school on the Economics of Quality. The author of works on in-creasing the efficiency of the regional development based on the implementation of the quality management models at the meso- and macro-levels. Under the leadership of  V.V. Okrepilov for the first time in Russia the Comprehensive Scientific and Technical Development Program of the Northwest Russia for a period of up to 2030 was developed. V.V. Okrepilov is one of the authors of the "Strategy on Social and Economic Development of St. Petersburg for the period of up to 2030" approved by the Decree of St. Petersburg Government of May 13, 2014, No. 355. Under his leadership fundamental scientific research and practical calculations of economic benefits gained from various activity in the fields of standardization and metrology were carried out for the first time; and a unique national quality management system based on application of the MBO planning methods aimed at increasing the pace of the national economy modernization was developed, the system having no direct analogues in the world. Has made a decisive scientific and organizational contribution to the development of the unique scientifically-based multilevel system of continuous personnel training in Economics of Quality. The scientific school «Economics and Quality Management» led by him is entered into the Register of the Leading Scientific and Pedagogical Schools of St. Petersburg.

References

1944 births
Living people
Russian economists
Academic staff of Herzen University